Irene Ferguson (born 1970 in Hokitika, New Zealand) is an artist best known for her portrait paintings. Ferguson was awarded the New Zealand Portraiture Award in 2008.

Training and Experience 
Ferguson gained a Diploma of Fine Arts with Honors from Otago School of Fine Art, Dunedin in 1993 and a Master of Fine Arts from the New York Academy of Art in 2005. From 2005 to 2006 Irene lived and worked in New York City. In 2010 she travelled to Italy to complete training in portraiture at the Charles H. Cecil Studios in Florence, Italy.

Fellowships and residencies 
In 2002 Ferguson was awarded the William Hodges Fellowship residency by the Southland Art Foundation. In 2008 Ferguson was the Artist in Residence at Samuel Marsden Collegiate School, Wellington.

Awards 
 In 2008 Ferguson won the New Zealand Portrait Gallery Adam Portraiture Award with The Blue Girl, Johanna Sanders in her Back Yard.
 In 2006 she was a finalist in the BP Portrait Award at the National Portrait Gallery, London.

Artist Residencies 
 1996 The Southland Art Foundation 'Artist in Residence' programme
 2002 William Hodges Fellowship
 2008 Artist in Residence at Samuel Marsden Collegiate School, Wellington.

Exhibitions

Solo 
 2012 Colossal, {Suite} Gallery, Wellington, New Zealand
 2011 Torrid Grey, Aratoi – Wairarapa Museum of Art & History, Masterton, New Zealand
 2010 Pine, {Suite} Gallery, Wellington, New Zealand
 2008 Wayward, Janne Land Gallery, Wellington, New Zealand 
 2003 sample; flesh and blood, Janne Land Gallery, Wellington, New Zealand
 2003 sample; flesh and blood, Southland Museum and Art Gallery, Invercargill, New Zealand

Group 
 2013–14 The Parkin Drawing Prize
 2013 Runner up, The 7th International Drawing Biennale, The Polish Art Foundation, Melbourne, Australia
 2008 Strive Towards Your Destiny, group show, Hirschfeld Gallery, Wellington
 2006 BP Portrait Award, National Portrait Gallery, London.

Work in Collections 
Ferguson's work is predominately held within New Zealand collections.
 James Wallace Art Trust, Auckland, New Zealand
 The New Zealand Portrait Gallery, Wellington, New Zealand
 Southland Art Foundation, Invercargill, New Zealand
 Southland Museum and Art Gallery, Invercargill, New Zealand

Reviews / Writing 
 2010 Mark Amery reviews portraiture from the Adam Portrait Award show.
 2008 Strive Towards Your Destiny, group show, Hirschfeld Gallery, Wellington. Review by Jessica Scott, City Gallery Wellington.
 2003 "sample; flesh and blood", Jane Land Gallery, Wellington. Reviewed in Art New Zealand, 2003.
 2003 Music and Braille, Peter Rae Gallery, Dunedin. Reviewed by Penny Hunt, Art New Zealand, Issue 109, 2003.

References

External links 
 Adam Award Article by Abby Cunnane published in the New Zealand Listener Magazine

Living people
1970 births
New Zealand painters
New York Academy of Art alumni
New Zealand women painters